Roger Frederick Sainsbury (born 2 October 1936) is a retired Anglican bishop. He was the second area Bishop of Barking (the seventh Bishop of Barking) in the Church of England from 1991 to 2002.

Sainsbury was educated at Jesus College, Cambridge before beginning his ordained ministry as a curate at Christ Church, Spitalfields. He was then "missioner" at Shrewsbury House, Liverpool, Warden of the Mayflower Family Centre, Canning Town; Vicar of Walsall; and finally, before being ordained to the episcopate, the Archdeacon of West Ham. In retirement he serves as an assistant bishop in the Diocese of Bath and Wells.

References

1936 births
Alumni of Jesus College, Cambridge
Archdeacons of West Ham
Bishops of Barking
20th-century Church of England bishops
21st-century Church of England bishops
Living people